SABC Children is a 24-hour online children's channel offering a mix of local and international content in South Africa.

History
In September 2011 SABC executives and the SABC board told parliament that the SABC's offering for digital terrestrial television (DTT) will consist of 18 TV channel including SABC1, SABC2, SABC3 as well as a children's channel before scrapping it in 2015.

In 2015, an online brand called Tuluntulu rolled out 18 free channels including SABC Education and SABC Children.

References

External links

Children's television
Television stations in South Africa